Sabine Gerke-Hochdörffer (born 15 November 1971) is a German former professional tennis player.

Biography
Gerke, who grew up in Zweibrücken, made her WTA Tour main draw debut at the 1989 German Open, where she took 11th seed Bettina Fulco to three sets in a first round loss. In 1990 she won an ITF tournament in Madeira, the first of her four ITF singles titles. She reached her career best ranking of 187 in 1991, after making the second round of the Oslo Open. A two-time Universiade medalist for Germany, she won doubles bronze medals at both the 1993 and 1995 tournaments.

She is married to Jörg Hochdörffer and lives in Bad Laasphe.

ITF finals

Singles (4–3)

Doubles (3–1)

References

External links
 
 

1971 births
Living people
West German female tennis players
German female tennis players
Sportspeople from Rhineland-Palatinate
Universiade medalists in tennis
Universiade bronze medalists for Germany
Medalists at the 1995 Summer Universiade